The IF Group also known as Grupo Iberoamericano de Fomento or Grupo Fierro is an economic group, originated in Spain, that has investments in Spain and Latin America, mostly in the industrial and financial sectors. The Fierro Group was founded by the Spanish entrepreneur and billionaire Ildefonso Fierro, a prominent Spanish businessman. The group is worth over US$4 billion with an annual net income in excess of US$300 million.

They started operations in Peru in 1961, when they installed a factory of matches, a product in which they are a world leader. In 2001 the Fierro Group in Peru was led by Manuel Isabal Roca and consisted of 18 companies, including Banco Interamericano de Finanzas (BIF), Fosforera Peruana, Tabacalera Nacional, Aval, Representaciones Alpamayo, Filtros del Perú, Destilería Peruana, Tabacalera del Sur, Industrial Cartavio, Verona Trading and Fosforera La Llama, employing around 5,000 staff between them.

In 1991 in Venezuela, the group owned Tabacalera Nacional (TANASA), today owned by Philip Morris, Fosforera Suramericana, C.A., Alimentos La Giralda, and Banco Exterior. Nowadays, Fierro Group in Venezuela (also known as Grupo Industrial Farallón de Venezuela: GIFVEN) has the first place of share market on match industry sales being also owners of different companies such as FOSUCA and DIFSA. Fierro Group companies had Factories such as Lander & Vera and Alimentos La Giralda which produce and distribute different manufactured goods related to liquors and canned food. Its most recognized brands are Fosforos el Sol, La Giralda, Ponche Imperial, Ruskaya, Licores Lander & Vera, among others.

In Ecuador, on October 24, 1958 Ignacio Fierro founded the company Fosforera Ecuatoriana S.A. (FESA) since then other companies were created: Tabacalera Nacional S.A. (Tanasa), acquired fully by Philip Morris in 2005, Banco Internacional, Seguros Cervantes, Grafandina S.A., Industria Licorera Iberoamericana S.A. (ILSA), PetroSud (Consorcio PetroSud-PetroRiva). In 2008 the leader of the Fierro Group in Ecuador was José Enrique Fuster Camps.

In August 2013, Francisco "Paco" Roche Navarro retired as leader of the Grupo IF banking division.  Ex-BBVA Vicente de la Parra was brought in to lead the banking division. The Banks are composed of Banco Exterior (Venezuela), Banco Internacional (Ecuador), EBNA Bank (Curaçao), Interbanco (Guatemala), International Finance Bank (United States) and BanBif (Peru).

International presence 

  Spain
  Argentina
  Brazil
  Colombia
  Guatemala
  Ecuador
  Peru
  Thailand
  Venezuela
  The United States of America

References

Financial services companies of Spain
Manufacturing companies of Spain